The Prague University of Economics and Business (PUEB)  (originally: the University of Economics, Prague; , VŠE) is a triple crown accredited economics and business-oriented public university located in Prague, Czech Republic. It is the largest university in the field of economics, business and information technology in the Czech Republic, with 14,000 students across its bachelor, master, doctoral and MBA programs. It is considered the best business school in the Czech Republic and one of the best in Central and Eastern Europe. It is also a part of the CEMS global alliance.

History
Vysoká škola obchodní ("Business School") was established in 1919 as a department of the Czech Technical University in Prague, specializing in wholesale trade, banking, and the organization of industrial companies. In 1949 the Vysoká škola politických a hospodářských věd (University of Political and Economic Sciences) was established, which was finally renamed the University of Economics in 1953. The university underwent a significant reform in 1989 in the aftermath of the Velvet Revolution. In 2020, the international designation of the University of Economics, Prague was changed to Prague University of Economics and Business.

Schools and campuses
The university is composed of six faculties spread over three campuses. The main campus is situated in Žižkov, a central district of the Czech capital. The university maintains a second campus on the outskirts of the city in Jižní Město. The premises of the Faculty of Management are located about 110km from Prague in Jindřichův Hradec.

The six faculties of the university are:
Faculty of Finance and Accounting (FFA)
Faculty of International Relations (FIR)
Faculty of Business Administration (FBA)
Faculty of Informatics and Statistics (FIS)
Faculty of Economics (FEPA)
Faculty of Management in Jindrichův Hradec (FM)

Academics and ranking
In the Eduniversal Ranking 2018, Prague University of Economics and Business (PUEB) gained the title of best Business School in Eastern Europe.

The Faculty of Business Administration (FBA) has been accredited by the European Quality Improvement System (EQUIS), the first business school in the Czech Republic and fourth in Central and Eastern Europe. The CEMS Master in Management program ranked 14th worldwide in the Financial Times Ranking 2021. According to the QS World University rankings, Prague University of Economics and Business has been ranked among top 251-300 under Economics and Econometrics. The Masters in Finance and Accounting program at the Prague University of Economics and Business has also been ranked among the top #101 worldwide according to QS Business Masters Rankings: Finance.

International co-operation
Over 1000 students spend a semester abroad every year, at institutions including Duke University (Fuqua School of Business), Copenhagen Business School, University of St. Gallen, and Vienna University. 

VŠE cooperates with 250 partner universities, including Sciences Po Paris, University of Cologne, Tilburg University, Stockholm School of Economics, University of St. Gallen, London School of Economics, Tel Aviv University, University of Queensland, McGill University, Duke University, University of Texas at Austin and University of North Carolina at Chapel Hill. The school issues a number of international degrees, including joint and double degrees. Each year, around 60 visiting professors come to teach at the university, and more than 90 courses are taught in English.

As of 2000, the university has been awarding the Gary Becker Prize for the best student's thesis in economics (a prize previously associated with IMADEC of Vienna).

The university is a member of the Global Alliance in Management Education (CEMS), Association of Professional Schools of International Affairs (APSIA), and Partnership in International Management (PIM) networks.

In addition, over 1100 students from institutions overseas come to VŠE each semester. In 2005, a new International Learning Center was established as part of expansion of university premises. Courses for these students are run in Czech, English, German, French, and Russian languages.

Notable alumni
 Jan Fischer (born 1951), statistician, Prime Minister of the Czech Republic (2009–10), Minister of Finance of the Czech Republic (2013–14). Graduated 1974, completed post-graduate studies 1985.
 Martin Jahn (born 1970), Czech politician and economist, Deputy Prime Minister for Economic Policy (2004–05). Graduated in 1994 with a Masters in International Trade.
 Petr Kellner (1964–2021), investor, businessman (one of the USD billionaires), and owner of PPF company.
 Václav Klaus (born 1941), President of the Czech Republic (2003–2013), Prime Minister of the Czech Republic (1992–97). Graduated in 1963 with a major in Foreign Trade Economics.
 Valtr Komárek (1930–2013), economist and politician
 Jiří Paroubek (born 1952), Prime Minister of the Czech Republic (2005–2006), Member of the Chamber of Deputies (2006–13), former chairman of Czech Social Democratic Party.
 Jiří Rusnok (born 1960), politician and economist, Prime Minister of the Czech Republic (2013–2014), Minister of Finance (2001–02), Minister of Industry and Trade (2002–03), graduated in 1984.
 Josef Tošovský (born 1950), Prime Minister of the Czech Republic (1997–1998), governor of the Czech National Bank (1989–1992; 1993–2000). Studied at the university from 1968 to 1973, graduated in Foreign Trade.
 Zdeněk Tůma (born 1960), governor of the Czech National Bank (2000–2010) and politician. Studied at the university from 1979–83.
 Miloš Zeman, Prime Minister of the Czech Republic (1998–2002), President of the Czech Republic (2013–present). Studied from 1965–69 at the university, specialising in Economic Forecasting, and taught.
 Josef Zieleniec (born 1946), Minister of Foreign Affairs of the Czech Republic (1993–97), Member of the European Parliament (2004–09). Graduated in 1974, specialising in Industrial Economics.
 Laura Longauerová (born 1995), Slovak model and beauty pageant titleholder who won Miss Slovakia 2014 and Miss Universe Slovenskej Republiky 2019.
 Josef Průša (born 1990), Creator of Prusa Research.

References

External links
 University website
 Virtual Economic Library Econlib website
 ISIS VŠE (Information system for students and teachers)
 iList (Independent student magazine and web)
 Economix (Student magazine)
 Unie studentů VŠE (Students' Union of the Prague University of Economics and Business)

Prague University of Economics and Business
Educational institutions in Prague
Educational institutions established in 1919
Universities of economics in Europe
Žižkov
1919 establishments in Czechoslovakia